Federal Route 282 is a dual-carriageway federal road in Penang state, Malaysia. Connecting Transkrian in the southwest to Bukit Panchor in the northeast. It is also a main route to Universiti Sains Malaysia (USM) Engineering Campus in Transkrian. The Kilometre Zero is located at Transkrian.

Features

At most sections, the Federal Route 282 was built under the JKR R5 road standard, allowing maximum speed limit of up to 90 km/h.

List of junctions and town

References

Malaysian Federal Roads
Roads in Penang